The 1948–49 İstanbul Football League season was the 41st season of the league. Galatasaray SK won the league for the 12th time.

Season

Topscorer

References

Istanbul Football League seasons
Turkey
2